Shahrak-e Chah Payab Chah Shatt (also Romanized as Shahraḵ-e Chāh Chāh Pāyāb Chāh Shatṭ; also known as Chāh Pāyāb and Chakpāi Āb) is a village in Shaskuh Rural District, Central District, Zirkuh County, South Khorasan Province, Iran. At the 2006 census, its population was 312, in 76 families.

References 

Populated places in Zirkuh County